Porchetta is a surname Of Italian origin. In Italy, the largest Porchetta family hails from the southern province of Campobasso. Immigration brought the Porchetta name to North America in the early 20th century. Predominantly located on the east coast, with the largest numbers in Montreal, Canada and the New York-New Jersey area. The Porchetta name is scattered across North America with families as far west as Vancouver, BC in Canada and Arizona in the United States.

Surnames